Sooner or Later is the seventh studio album by Murray Head. It was released in 1987.

In 2001 it was reissued by Headcase with two bonus tracks, "Picking up the Pieces" and "Some People". It was produced by Steve Hillage and features his partner in life Miquette Giraudy on keyboards.

Track listing
All songs composed by Murray Head unless noted.
"You Are" - 5:02
"With a Passion" (Barry Hovis, Mark Mancina) - 3:37
"Love List"
"Love is Believing" - 5:11
"In the Heart of You" (Peter Veitch) - 4:20
"Paper Thin" (Geoffrey Richardson) - 3:26
"Fear and Ambition" - 5:14
"Wanderer" - 5:41
"Lana Turner" - 3:44

Additional tracks
"Picking Up the Pieces" (Chris Difford, Glenn Tilbrook) - 4:03
"Some People" - 6:42

Personnel
Murray Head - vocals, guitar
Phil Palmer - guitar
Paul Weston - guitar
Geoffrey Richardson - violin, flute, guitar, kalimba, string arrangements
Simon Jeffes - string arrangements
Ian Maidman - bass guitar
Miquette Giraudy - keyboards
Ingmar Kiang - keyboards
Peter Veitch - piano
Gary Barnacle - saxophone
La Fuga Horn Section - horns
Danny Cummings - drums
Luís Jardim - percussion
Barbara Gaskin - background vocals
Dave Stewart - background vocals
Anthony Stewart Head - background vocals
Jakko M. Jakszyk - background vocals
Sally Ann Triplett - background vocals
 Grainne Renihan - background vocals

External links
Sooner or Later at the official Murray Head site.
[ Sooner or Later] at Allmusic.

Murray Head albums
1987 albums
Albums produced by Steve Hillage
Virgin Records albums